Hasret Altındere (born January 1, 1980) is a Turkish former women's footballer. She was part of the Turkish women's national team between 1998 and 2002.

Hasret Altındere was born in Bornova district of Izmir Province, Turkey.

Playing career

Club
She began her sports career after receiving her license for Balıkesir Belediyespor on October 24, 1997. She transferred to Susurluk Barışspor for the 1998–99 season. After one season, she moved to Gemlik Zeytinspor. In the beginning of 2001, Altındere signed for Kuzeyspor, where she played two seasons until 2002.

International
Hasret Altındere was admitted to the national team in 1998. After sitting on the bench in her first match at the 1999 FIFA Women's World Cup qualification (UEFA) - Group G match against Bulgaria, she debuted in the Women's Harvest Cup match against the Austrian team on July 29, 1998. She netted a goal in the match with Israel of the same tournament.

Altındere was also part of the Turkey women's U-19 team in two matches of the 1999 UEFA Women's Under-19 Championship qualifying round.

She played in one match of the 2001 UEFA Women's Championship qualification - Group 8 and in eight matches of the 2003 FIFA Women's World Cup qualification (UEFA) - Group 8 round. Altındere netted two goals against the women from  Bosnia and Herzegovina. She capped in a total of 20 games for Turkey, and scored three goals.

See also
 Turkish women in sports

References

1980 births
People from Bornova
Footballers from İzmir
Turkish women's footballers
Turkey women's international footballers
Living people

Women's association footballers not categorized by position